"I Like Me Better" is a song recorded and produced by American singer Lauv. It was released on May 19, 2017, and is included on Lauv's compilation album I Met You When I Was 18 (The Playlist), which was released on May 31, 2018. The song was written by Lauv and Michael Matosic. It has also been used in an Android Auto app commercial, in the trailer of Netflix's romantic comedy To All the Boys I've Loved Before, and in the fall ball episode of  Netflix's comedy series The Expanding Universe of Ashley Garcia.

"I Like Me Better" reached the top ten in Australia, Austria and Germany, the top-twenty in New Zealand and Slovakia, and the top-forty in Belgium, the Czech Republic, Denmark, Hungary, Ireland, Norway, Sweden, Switzerland. In his native United States, the song was a sleeper hit, spending over six months on the US Billboard Hot 100 before reaching number 27 in September 2018. It was also used as a background music during the evening gown competition of Miss Universe 2018.

Background and composition
The song was inspired by Lauv's move to New York City and falling in love shortly afterwards. After arriving at the studio with "no concept, no lyrics, no idea I was going to write that song" he chopped together a voice memo he left himself intending to change the sound later although he never did.

Musically, "I Like Me Better" is an electropop song that contains elements of Guitar pop, snap and Alt-pop, as well as vocal effects. According to the sheet music published at musicnotes.com, the song is written in the key of A major. The song's verses are resigned and have a quaint and simple sound, laden with a simple, jangly guitar loop, an Electric piano and a sparse, finger-click beat that transitions into drum beats in the chorus. Lauv's vocals span from the low note of B2 to the high note of C#5. It features a prominent sound effect that sounds similar to a synthesizer. The sound was Lauv's voice, which he recorded on his phone.

Commercial performance
After spending a number of weeks on the Bubbling Under Hot 100 Singles chart, "I Like Me Better" made its official debut on the US Billboard Hot 100 at number 96 for the issue dated February 24, 2018. It has since reached number 27, becoming his first top-forty hit on the Hot 100. On the Mainstream Top 40 chart, "I Like Me Better" reached the top 10 after a historic 35-week climb, breaking the record for the longest time to reach the top 10 on the chart.

"I Like Me Better" proved to be a strong hit in parts of Europe and Oceania. In Australia, the song peaked at number eight on the ARIA Singles Chart, with it being certified triple Platinum by the Australian Recording Industry Association (ARIA) for exceeding 210,000 sales and streams. Similarly, the song peaked at number 13 on the New Zealand Singles Chart, and obtained a platinum certification there.

The song also reached success in Austria and Germany, where it peaked at numbers five and seven respectively. It ranked as the forty-second best selling song on the Official German Charts year-end list of 2017, selling 400,000 copies there.

Music video
Its cast features Lauv, himself and Paige Spara as the younger self of the actors Richard Bergman and Michelle Star, respectively in the song.

Charts

Weekly charts

Year-end charts

Certifications

References

2017 singles
2017 songs
Lauv songs
Songs written by Lauv